Cyperus hieronymi is a species of sedge that is native to southern parts of South America. It occurs in Argentina, Bolivia and Paraguay.

The species was first formally described by the botanist Johann Otto Boeckeler in 1888.

See also 
 List of Cyperus species

References 

hieronymi
Taxa named by Johann Otto Boeckeler
Plants described in 1888
Flora of Argentina
Flora of Bolivia
Flora of Paraguay